The Kalyani Inscriptions, located in Bago, Myanmar, are the stone inscriptions erected by King Dhammazedi of Hanthawaddy Pegu between 1476 and 1479. Located at the Kalyani Ordination Hall (Kalyani Sima) outside Bago, the inscriptions commemorate the reformation of Burmese Buddhism in Ceylon's Mahavihara tradition between 1476 and 1479. The inscriptions are the most important sources on religious contacts between Burma and Sri Lanka.

King Dhammazedi, a former monk, proclaimed in the inscriptions that Buddhism in Ramanya (Lower Burma) was in decline as sectarianism had developed and the Orders had grown farther and farther away from their original purity; that he emulated great model Buddhist kings Anawrahta of Pagan, Sithu II of Pagan and Parakramabahu I of Ceylon who, according to him, kept the religion pure and reformed the sangha in the "orthodox" brand of Theravada Buddhism that he was attempting to do; and that he had sent the sangha to Ceylon to be re-ordained in the Mahavihara tradition as King Sithu II had done.

The inscriptions were so named because the sangha of Lower Burma were re-ordained on the Kalyani river (near modern Colombo). The language of the first three stones is Pali, inscribed using the Burmese script. The rest of the stones are Mon translation. They are inscribed on both faces, with 70 lines of text to each face, three letters to an inch (2.54 cm).

Some of the original stone slabs were destroyed by the Portuguese in the early 17th century and Konbaung forces in 1757. Several carefully preserved palm-leaf manuscripts survived. Taw Sein Ko translated the inscriptions from the palm-leaf manuscripts into English and Pali written in Latin script.

Notes

References

Bibliography
 
 
 
 

Burmese chronicles
Multilingual texts
Hanthawaddy dynasty
Inscriptions of Myanmar
Burmese Buddhist texts
Buddhist inscriptions